Rohit Gandhi is an Indian journalist and cameraman. He was the Editor-in-chief of World is One News (WION) and DNA India.

Education
In 1989, Gandhi enrolled in University of Delhi for his undergraduate education. He was awarded the degree of Bachelor of Arts (Hons.) Sociology and Anthropology in 1992.

In 1992, after completing his graduation, he went to University of Pune for further studies. Here, he was studying for a master's degree in Communication and Media Studies.

In 1999, he went to Carleton University in Canada to study broadcast journalism. He completed his study the next year and achieved a master's degree in Broadcast Journalism.

Career
From 2000 to 2006, he was a producer at CNN.

Between 2015 and 2017, he was the Editor-in-chief of Zee Media CL (Digital), WION and DNA India.

Rohit founded Democracy News Live a digital news network in 2017.

References

Living people
Year of birth missing (living people)